Jekyll Island Airport is a small general aviation airport located in Jekyll Island, Georgia, United States. It is around 2 miles away from central Jekyll Island.

Due to its small runway size and the nearby Brunswick Golden Isles Airport, no commercial airlines fly there, but scenic tours of the island fly from there. The airport has three based aircraft, and around 74 aircraft operations a day.

References

Airports in Georgia (U.S. state)
Jekyll Island